This list of Gonzaga University alumni includes notable graduates, non-graduate former students, and current students of Gonzaga University, a private, coeducational research university located in Spokane, Washington, United States.

Academia and research

University administration

Professors

Business

Entertainment

Government

Federal government

State governments

Sports

Basketball 

Eli Morgan (born 1996), baseball pitcher for the Cleveland Indians
Josh Perkins (born 1995), basketball player for Hapoel Gilboa Galil of the Israeli Basketball Premier League

References

Gonzaga University alumni